Valise Equipment, Pattern 1888 (also known as Slade-Wallace Equipment) was a leather harness used by the British Armed Forces.

History
The equipment was designed in 1888 by Colonel Slade and Major Wallace for use with the first .303-inch calibre rifles, replacing the Valise Equipment, Pattern 1870, which had entered service in 1871. The belts, straps and pouches were made from buff coloured leather, which was whitened with pipe clay; the haversack was made of white canvas, except for rifle regiments which had black. 

It was the standard equipment worn by British and Imperial infantry during the Second Boer War. It proved unsuitable for holding modern ammunition, because the pouches had been designed before the introduction of the clip charger which allowed for rapid reloading, and could only accommodate individual rounds. The leather also tended to deteriorate during long periods in the field. After the war, review of the British Army's performance was conducted by the 1903 Royal Commission on the War in South Africa, which heard evidence that the Slade-Wallace equipment was "cumbersome, heavy and badly balanced" and "an absurdity". As a stop-gap measure, the leather 1903 Bandolier Equipment was issued, but it quickly proved to be unsuitable for infantry use and was itself replaced by the 1908 Pattern Webbing.

After the outbreak of the First World War, quantities of Slade-Wallace equipment sets were brought out of storage for the use of recruits in training, and was used on active service by some British colonial troops in the East African campaign. The whitened Slade-Wallace equipment continued to be worn for ceremonial duties by the Brigade of Guards until 1939, and other regiments in that era sometimes wore the whitened belt with Service Dress on formal occasions.

Description
The complete equipment consisted of:
 one waistbelt
 two pouches
 a pair of braces with movable buckles and a keeper
 two greatcoat straps
 one mess tin strap
 one valise
 one reserve magazine pouch

The leather was coloured according to regiment. It was left buff and then coloured black for rifle regiments, and whitened on the outer surfaces for infantry regiments. A pouch with a reserve magazine (for the Lee-Metford/Lee-Enfield rifle), like a spade, was worn only with the appropriate order. Outside of the marching order, one ammunuition pouch was worn (on the back, or on the right side). The special magazine pouch nominally was a possible element of equipment until the introduction of SMLE No. 1 Mk. I and 1903 Bandolier Equipment, but were not mass issued in practice, with some particular exceptions for some squads and positions.

References

British Army equipment
Personal military carrying equipment